The 1994 United States Senate election in Ohio took place on November 8, 1994. Incumbent Democratic U.S Senator Howard Metzenbaum decided to retire after 19 years in the United States Senate. Republican nominee Mike DeWine won the open seat against Democratic nominee Joel Hyatt. Independent candidate, conservative anti-abortion activist Joe Slovenec performed very well, getting over 7% of the vote.

Candidates

Democratic 
 Joel Hyatt, businessman and son-in-law of incumbent U.S. Senator Howard Metzenbaum
 Mary O. Boyle, former Ohio State Representative

Republican 
 Mike DeWine, Lieutenant Governor and nominee in 1992
 Bernadine Healy, former Director of the National Institutes of Health

Independent 
 Joe Slovenec, anti-abortion activist

Results

See also 
 1994 United States Senate elections

References 

1994
Ohio
1994 Ohio elections